Maria Tsiartsiani (born 21 October 1980 in Thessaloniki) is a Greek Olympic beach volleyballer.   She competed at the 2008 Summer Olympics, partnering with Efthalia Koutroumanidou.  At the 2012 Summer Olympics, she competed with Vassiliki Arvaniti.

References

1980 births
Greek beach volleyball players
Beach volleyball players at the 2008 Summer Olympics
Beach volleyball players at the 2012 Summer Olympics
Olympic beach volleyball players of Greece
Living people
Greek sportswomen
Sportspeople from Thessaloniki